CMA CGM Bougainville is container ship, built in 2015 by Samsung Heavy Industries for CMA CGM on French Asia Line (FAL). The vessel was the largest container carrier operating under the flag of France. The vessel is the largest container ship in the world at the time of her launch in August 2015, having maximum capacity for 18,000 TEU with 1,254 reefer plugs.

Design and engineering

The boxship CMA CGM Bougainville together with her five sister-vessels is the flagship for the French container line CMA CGM. The boxship CMA CGM Bougainville has maximum capacity for 18,000 TEU with 1,254 reefer plugs.

-

Engineering
The container ship CMA CGM Bougainville is driven by modern low-speed engine MAN B&W 11S90ME-C9.2, which has total output power of 64,000 kW.

See also
List of largest container ships
Largest container shipping companies

References

External links
CMA CGM Bougainville at ShipsReviews.com

Container ships
Bougainville
Bougainville
Ships built by Samsung Heavy Industries
2015 ships